Joeri van Dijk-Passchier (born 14 July 1983 in The Hague) is a windsurfer from the Netherlands, who represented his country at the 2004 Summer Olympics in Athens. Van Dijk took the 20th place on the Men's Mistral One Design.

Further reading

2004 Olympics (Athens)

References

External links
 
 
 

1983 births
Living people
Dutch windsurfers
Dutch male sailors (sport)
Olympic sailors of the Netherlands
Sailors at the 2004 Summer Olympics – Mistral One Design
Sportspeople from The Hague